The 2011 General Cup was a professional non-ranking snooker tournament that took place between 4–7 July 2011 at the General Snooker Club in Hong Kong.

Stephen Lee won in the final 7–6 against Ricky Walden.

Prize fund
The breakdown of prize money for this year is shown below:
Winner: $50,000
Runner-up: $25,000
2nd in group: $15,000
3rd in group: $8,000
Century break: $2,000
Highest break (>100): $20,000
Highest break (<100): $10,000
Maximum break: $147,000

Round robin stage

Group A

 Tom Ford 5–3 Thepchaiya Un-Nooh
 Stephen Lee 5–3 Thepchaiya Un-Nooh
 Stephen Lee 5–0 Tom Ford

Group B

 Marco Fu 5–1 Noppadol Sangnil
 Ricky Walden 5–0 Noppadol Sangnil
 Ricky Walden 5–4 Marco Fu

Final

Century breaks

128, 100  Ricky Walden
108  Stephen Lee

References 

2011
2011 in snooker
2011 in Hong Kong sport